Snezhana Yurukova (born 20 October 1944) is a Bulgarian hurdler. She competed in the women's 80 metres hurdles at the 1968 Summer Olympics.

References

1944 births
Living people
Athletes (track and field) at the 1968 Summer Olympics
Bulgarian female hurdlers
Bulgarian pentathletes
Olympic athletes of Bulgaria
People from Pleven Province